USA-299, also referred to as USSF-7 and Orbital Test Vehicle 6 (OTV-6), is the third flight of the first Boeing X-37B, an American unmanned vertical-takeoff, horizontal-landing spaceplane. It was launched to low Earth orbit aboard an Atlas V launch vehicle from SLC-41 on 17 May 2020. Its mission designation is part of the USA series.

The spaceplane is operated by the United States Space Force, which considers the mission classified and as such has not revealed the objectives. However an unclassified secondary satellite, FalconSat-8, was deployed from the X-37B soon after launch.

Mission 
OTV-6 is the third mission for the first X-37B built, and the sixth X-37B mission overall. It flew on an Atlas V in the 501 configuration, and launched from Cape Canaveral Space Launch Complex 41. This flight is the first time the space plane has been equipped with a service module to carry additional pieces for experiments.

OTV-6 was deployed into an orbit with an inclination of approximately 44.60°.

OTV-6 landed after a record-breaking 908 days at the Shuttle Landing Facility on November 12, 2022.

FalconSat-8 
A rideshare payload for the United States Air Force Academy, FalconSat-8, was deployed from the X-37B a few days into the mission. The satellite provides a platform for the Academy's Cadet Space Operations Squadron to test various technologies.

Onboard experiments include:
 MEP (Magnetic gradient Electrostatic Plasma thruster), a novel electromagnetic propulsion system
 MMA (Metamaterial antenna), a low power, high performance antenna
 CANOE (CArbon NanOtubes Experiment)
 ACES (Attitude Control and Energy Storage), a commercial reaction wheel modified into a flywheel
 SkyPad, off-the-shelf cameras and GPUs integrated into a low power package

See also 

 USA-212
 USA-226

References 

USA satellites
United States Space Force
Spacecraft launched in 2020
Boeing X-37